Samantha June Mewis (born October 9, 1992) is an American professional soccer player who plays as a midfielder for Kansas City Current of the National Women's Soccer League (NWSL), as well as the United States national team. She played college soccer for the UCLA Bruins. Her club career started in 2013 when she signed with Pali Blues of the W-League and she has since won three NWSL Championship titles with Western New York Flash and North Carolina Courage.

Early life
Born in Weymouth, Massachusetts, to Robert and Melissa Mewis, Samantha grew up in Hanson, Massachusetts, where she attended Whitman-Hanson Regional High School and played on the soccer team, tallying 77 goals and 34 assists during her time there. She grew up with her older sister Kristie, playing soccer for numerous youth teams, including club team, Scorpions SC, as well as the under-17 and under-20 United States national teams. Mewis earned Parade All-American honors twice during her high school years and was named the National Soccer Coaches Association of America national player of the year in 2010. In 2011, she was named Gatorade Massachusetts Girls Soccer Player of the Year for the second time after receiving the accolade previously for 2009–10. The same year, she was named ESPN RISE All-American after scoring 30 goals and serving 8 assists during her senior year.

UCLA Bruins
In her first year, Mewis was second on the team in scoring with six goals and seven assists, only bested by current United States women's national soccer team member Sydney Leroux and was named to the Pac-12 All-Freshman Team. Due to national team commitments, Sam missed the first six games of her second season, but finished the year with three goals and three assists in 16 games. In her junior year, Mewis helped UCLA win the Pac-12 championship on the way to its first NCAA Championship. In December 2014, she was named the winner of the 2015 Honda Award for soccer by the Collegiate Women Sports Awards (CWSA).

Club career

Pali Blues
In 2013, Mewis signed with the Pali Blues in the W-League. The team won the western conference title  as well as the national championship in July 2013.

Western New York Flash, 2015–2016
Mewis was selected fourth overall by the Western New York Flash in the 2015 National Women's Soccer League entry draft. She started all 20 regular-season games for the Flash, scoring 4 goals and providing 4 assists to share the top of the team scoring leaderboard with Lynn Williams. On September 9, 2015, the NWSL announced that Mewis was selected as a finalist for the NWSL Rookie of the Year Award for the 2015 season, along with Sofia Huerta and the eventual winner, Danielle Colaprico.

In the 2016 season, Mewis missed several games as she was away training with the U.S. WNT in preparations for the 2016 Summer Olympics. The Western New York Flash finished fourth in the standings and qualified for the play-offs. In the semi-final, Mewis scored a goal in the 16th minute helping the Western New York Flash to upset the Shield winning Portland Thorns. In the NWSL Championship game Mewis once again scored a goal. The Championship game went to penalties, Mewis missed her penalty but the flash went on to win the Championship, winning the penalty shootout 3–2.

North Carolina Courage, 2017–2020
It was announced on January 9, 2017, that the Western New York Flash was officially sold to new ownership, moved to North Carolina, and rebranded as the North Carolina Courage.
Mewis had a very successful 2017 season, as she appeared in every game for the Courage, tallying 6 goals and 3 assists. She was named to the NWSL Best XI and was a finalist for the NWSL Most Valuable Player Award.

Mewis missed the beginning of the 2018 season as she was recovering from a knee injury. She appeared in 17 regular season games, as the Courage won their second consecutive NWSL Shield. In the play-offs, Mewis was in the starting line-up for the semi-final match against the Chicago Red Stars and scored a goal in the 86th minute. North Carolina won 2–0 and advanced to their second straight championship game. She played all 90 minutes in the NWSL Championship game as the Courage defeated the Portland Thorns 3–0. Mewis has now won two NWSL Championships.

Due to her participation in the 2019 World Cup, Mewis only appeared in 12 regular season games for the Courage in 2019. North Carolina won the NWSL Shield for the third consecutive season. They advanced to the final after defeating Reign FC in the semi-final. Mewis scored a goal in the championship game as North Carolina defeated the Chicago Red Stars 4–0 to win their second consecutive NWSL Championship.

With the 2020 season affected by the COVID-19 pandemic, Mewis took part in the 2020 NWSL Challenge Cup, making five appearances and scoring one goal as North Carolina topped the standings in the preliminary round but were eliminated in the first knockout round by #8 seed Portland Thorns FC.

Manchester City, 2020–2021
On August 10, 2020, Mewis signed with Manchester City of the English FA WSL ahead of the 2020–21 season. She made her competitive debut for the club at Wembley Stadium on August 29 as a 68th minute substitute during a 2–0 defeat to Chelsea in the 2020 Women's FA Community Shield. In total, Mewis made 32 appearances and scored 16 goals including the winner against Arsenal in the semi-final of the delayed 2019–20 Women's FA Cup and again in the final as Manchester City beat Everton 3–1 in extra-time to defend their title. City finished second in the league for the fourth consecutive season, this time losing out to Chelsea. Mewis was named to the FA WSL PFA Team of the Year at the end of the season.

North Carolina Courage, 2021
On May 17, 2021, Mewis rejoined North Carolina Courage.

Kansas City Current, 2022–present
On November 30, 2021, Mewis was traded to Kansas City Current in exchange for Kiki Pickett and the No. 3 overall pick in the 2022 NWSL Draft.

International career

Mewis was a member of the United States under-17 team that was runner-up at the 2008 FIFA U-17 Women's World Cup in New Zealand. As her sister Kristie was also a member of the team, they were the first sisters to represent the United States at a Women's World Cup. They also played together at the 2010 FIFA U-20 Women's World Cup.  At the 2012 FIFA U-20 Women's World Cup, Mewis helped the team win the championship after defeating Germany 1–0 in the final.

On January 24, 2014, Mewis was named for the first time to the senior national team roster for friendlies against Canada and Russia. She made her debut for the team at the 2014 Algarve Cup during the team's second match of the tournament, a 1–0 loss to Sweden.

After a spell out of the team, Mewis was invited back to the senior team following their success at the 2015 FIFA Women's World Cup. She continued to get regular playing time, scoring four goals in 2016 including the winning goal against Germany in the 2016 She Believes Cup that won the United States the trophy. Mewis was named as an alternate for the U.S. WNT for the 2016 Summer Olympics.

In 2017 Mewis was one of three players to appear in every game for the U.S. WNT., she played 1,242 minutes which was second highest on the team. She scored three goals and was a finalist for 2017 U.S Female Player of the Year.

Mewis suffered a knee injury in a November 2017 game against Canada, which would sideline her for the beginning of 2018, forcing her to miss the 2018 SheBelieves Cup. Mewis returned to the field for the U.S. in June 2018 in a friendly against China. In September 2018 she was named to the final 20 player roster of the 2018 CONCACAF Women's Championship.

In May 2019, Mewis was named to the final 23-player roster for the 2019 FIFA Women's World Cup. She played in 6 out of 7 matches, including the final, and scored two goals, both as part of a 13–0 group stage victory over Thailand. The United States won the 2019 World Cup after defeating the Netherlands 2–0.

In 2020, Mewis played in 8 of the 9 matches for the USA, started 6 matches, and scored 4 goals. In December 2020, Mewis was named the 2020 U.S. Soccer Female Player of the Year for the first time. She is the 17th player to win the award.

On January 18, 2021, Mewis scored her first career hat-trick for either club or country in a 4–0 friendly win against Colombia. Her sister Kristie scored the only other goal.

Personal life
Mewis' sister, Kristie, also plays for the United States women's national soccer team and plays professionally for NJ/NY Gotham FC. In late December 2018, Mewis married longtime boyfriend Pat Johnson in Boston, Massachusetts.

Following the United States' win at the 2019 FIFA Women's World Cup, Mewis and her teammates were honored with a Ticker tape parade in New York City. Each player received a key to the city from Mayor Bill de Blasio. After winning the 2019 FIFA Women's World Cup, Mewis revealed that while she was young, her father, Bob Mewis, would pick up side jobs to be able to afford her and her sister's soccer expenses.

Career statistics

Club

International

Scores and results list the United States's goal tally first, score column indicates score after each Mewis goal.

Honors
UCLA
 NCAA Women's Soccer Championship: 2013

Western New York Flash
NWSL Champions: 2016

North Carolina Courage
NWSL Champions: 2018, 2019
NWSL Shield: 2017, 2018, 2019

Manchester City
Women's FA Cup: 2019–20

United States U20

 FIFA U20 Women's World Cup: 2012

 CONCACAF Women's U-20 Championship: 2012
United States

 FIFA Women's World Cup: 2019
 CONCACAF Women's Championship: 2018

 CONCACAF Women's Olympic Qualifying Tournament: 2016; 2020
SheBelieves Cup: 2016; 2020
Tournament of Nations: 2018
Olympic Bronze Medal: 2020

Individual
 U.S. Soccer Female Player of the Year: 2020
NWSL Best XI: 2017
ESPN FC Women's Rank: #1 on the 2021 list of 50 best women's soccer players
FA WSL PFA Team of the Year: 2020–21
Honda Sports Award 2015

See also
 List of UCLA Bruins people
 2012 CONCACAF Under-20 Women's Championship squads
 2010 FIFA U-20 Women's World Cup squads

References

Match reports

External links

 
 US Soccer player profile
 North Carolina Courage player profile
 UCLA player profile

1992 births
Living people
United States women's international soccer players
UCLA Bruins women's soccer players
American women's soccer players
Parade High School All-Americans (girls' soccer)
Soccer players from Massachusetts
Pali Blues players
National Women's Soccer League players
Western New York Flash players
Sportspeople from Weymouth, Massachusetts
Women's association football midfielders
Western New York Flash draft picks
United States women's under-20 international soccer players
North Carolina Courage players
Whitman-Hanson Regional High School alumni
2019 FIFA Women's World Cup players
FIFA Women's World Cup-winning players
Manchester City W.F.C. players
Women's Super League players
American expatriate sportspeople in England
Expatriate women's footballers in England
Footballers at the 2020 Summer Olympics
Olympic bronze medalists for the United States in soccer
Medalists at the 2020 Summer Olympics
Kansas City Current players